The Poland national rugby sevens team is a minor national sevens side.
They compete in Europe’s Sevens Grand Prix Series.

2008 Hannover Sevens
Group B matches -

The speed advisor or the speed coach of the "Olympic team 2016" is Mr. Marcin Urbas, 200 m PB 19.98s.

References

Rugby sevens in Poland
Poland national rugby union team
National rugby sevens teams